Pyropelta ryukyuensis is a species of small sea snail, a deep-water limpet, a marine gastropod mollusks in the family Pyropeltidae.

Distribution 
This small limpet occurs at hydrothermal vents in the Okinawa Trough, Japan

References

Pyropeltidae
Gastropods described in 2008